Arnolol is a beta blocker.

References 

Beta blockers
Antihypertensive agents
Phenoxypropanolamines